Meghna Division (Bengali: মেঘনা বিভাগ) is a proposed administrative division within Bangladesh for the north-western parts of the existing Chittagong Division, comprising Brahmanbaria, Comilla, Chandpur, Noakhali, Feni, and Laxmipur Districts of Chittagong Division. The headquarter of the division is in Comilla.

Terminology and naming dispute
Various terms are used to describe the different (and sometimes overlapping) geographical and political areas of the proposed Meghna division. In brief, the main terms and their simple explanations are as follows:
 Geographical terms:
 Samatata (or Samatat) ; was an ancient kingdom. Cumilla region and greater Nokhali region were within The Kingdom of Samatata.Geographically, the proposed Division is made up of two distinct cultural regions – Cumilla  and Greater Noakhali.
 Greater Noakhali;- The ancient name of Noakhali is Bhulua. The Noakhali district was created by the British Indian Government in 1787. It included the Sub-divisions of Lakshmipur and Feni which eventually became separate districts in 1984.
 Comilla,- Established as the Tippera or Tipperah district of Bengal by the British in 1790 and later renamed as Comilla in 1960. It included the Sub-divisions of Brahmanbaria and Chandpur which eventually became separate districts in 1984.
 Roshanbad (or Rowshanabad): (roughly equating to the proposed Cumilla Division, excluding Rangamati Hill District). It was a district level administrative unit (Chakla) in Bengal Subah during Mughal period.

History 

The Greater Noakhali District was established in 1868 as a renaming of the Bhola District, which the British founded on 29 March 1822. It headquarters was in the town of Noakhali until the town vanished in the river-bed in 1951, as a result of the Meghna River erosion. A new headquarters for the Noakhali District was then established at Maijdee.

The present Cumilla was once under ancient Kingdom of Samatata and was joined with Tripuri Kingdom. In 1732, it became the center of the Bengal-backed domain of Jagat Manikya.

The Peasants Movement against the king of Tripura in 1764, which originally formed under the leadership of Shamsher Gazi. It came under the rule of East India Company in 1765 and was established as Tippera district (also known as Chakla Roshanbad) in 1790.  Later, it was reorganized  in three phases into six districts.

Administrative districts

The Division will be subdivided into six districts (zilas) and thence into 59 sub-districts (upazilas). The six districts listed below comprise the north-western portion (37.6%) of the present Chittagong Division, while the remaining five districts (zilas) comprise the south-eastern portion (62.4%) being separated by the lower (or Bangladeshi) stretch of the Feni River.

Demographics 
The division would have a population of 16,918,446. 16,008,777 (94.62%) are Muslims, 899,286 (5.32%) Hindus.

See also 
 Padma Division

References

History of Chittagong Division
Divisions of Bangladesh
Proposed political divisions
Cumilla District
Greater Tripura Region
Proposed divisions of Bangladesh